Celeste Rizvana Buckingham (born May 3, 1995) is a Slovak singer and songwriter of Swiss-American origins. The former finalist of Česko Slovenská SuperStar (2011), Buckingham gained early recognition on the second season of the Czech and Slovak reality television series SuperStar, co-produced for audiences of the two nations. Even though eliminated from the talent contest, having placed tenth, she promptly established herself as an independent artist. Her first singles, "Blue Guitar" and "Nobody Knows", each found a top-ten response on the component airplay chart in her home country, and so did her first collaboration with Majk Spirit on "Ja a ty", recorded for the rapper's studio album Nový človek. Nevertheless, her mainstream record followed the eventual release of her full-length debut entitled Don't Look Back (2012).

Issued to favorable reviews on EMI Czech Republic, the set experienced a moderate success commercially, peaking at number thirty-seven on the Top 50 Prodejní. Unlike its lead single, "Run Run Run", which climbed up the national charts in both fellow territories to number two, overall being ranked as the most played song for any Slovak performer in the respective year, or rather second in the Czech neighborhood. The composition also earned a number of nominations, most notably at the 19th MTV Europe Music Awards, making Buckingham the only female nominee within her own category, with four nominations in total at the local Slávik Awards. Some of those however acknowledged her general achievements in the music industry, such as the category New Artist of the Year, her winning at the ceremony.

Her subsequent outputs garnered attention within their format. Among them were a track recorded for AMO group, "Swing", and a solo single called "Never Be You". Her most recent release, "I Was Wrong", serves as her second duet with Spirit. In addition to performing arts, Buckingham is also an occasional host and model, and is a co-author of children's literature with one published work, The Lost Princess (2007), written with her sister Carmel, issued by Divis-Slovakia. On stage, one of the singer's most characteristic features is her barefoot performances, influenced by Joss Stone.

Biography

1995–2006: Early life
Celeste Rizvana Buckingham was born on May 3, 1995 in Zurich, Switzerland to the parents from different multicultural backgrounds. Her father, Thomas (born 1954), is a Chicago-native American with British-Irish origins, and her mother Zarin (born 1961), whose ancestry originates partly in Russia, is also of Iranian descent. Her mother also reportedly has Greek and Czech roots. Celeste is a naturalized citizen of Switzerland, thus holding multiple citizenship herself. According to Celeste's own words printed in MF DNES, her mother had left her native Iran in exchange for the Swiss Confederation, reportedly in her mid-teens. While she was abroad, she met her soon-to-be husband, at that time University student, with whom she later moved to Alaska. Buckingham would spend her early childhood in Anchorage, where her father worked as a cardiologist.
In 1999, the Buckinghams relocated to the European continent. Her father accepted a job offer, settling the family in Slovakia. For an interview published on August 29, 2012 in Slovak national daily newspaper SME, the singer recalled: "When we were yet little with sister, we lived in Alaska. Before our parents lived in Switzerland for a while, constantly thinking about them returning to Europe. However they wouldn't be longer attracted to Switzerland, and so they were considering where else, well, they could settle. The choice felt upon Slovakia as my father-doctor had gotten a job over there, which was a fundamental precondition to support his family. Originally we supposed to stay [there] only for a year, so then we will see. And [t]here we are for nearly thirteen years already." Since the age of three, Buckingham was raised with her younger sister, Carmel, in their foster country. Growing up in Borinka, a nearby village of the capital Bratislava, she was encouraged to take lessons in classical ballet and Latin dance. Later she began playing musical instruments, such as guitar and piano.

2007–2010: The Lost Princess era

Buckingham made her public debut in the field of juvenile literature.  In 2007, at the age of twelve, she crafted with her younger sister a short story, chronicling the adventures of the princess Lilly and her "lost" little sister, Blossom. Inspired by a L. Frank Baum book, The Lost Princess by Celeste and Carmel Buckingham was published on October 1, 2007 by Divis-Slovakia. Shortly after its paperback release, the girls' father summarized the result for Amazon.com, stating in his review: "The story is about the kidnapping of the younger of 2 sisters and how the older sister is able to find her and bring her back to her family. The characters have many adventures and go thru [sic] many difficulties before their family is reunited. The characters must grow and become stronger thru [sic] these difficulties [...]." Their picture book illustrated by Georgina Soar would not attract particular attention, and neither of the daughters would reprise their attempt in the literary genre.

Instead, Buckingham gradually started writing acoustic songs on her own, some of which would later result in a child "album", while with her sister she set up their off-stage band Anchorage, named after the city in Alaska they once resided in. One of her first rough demos, "Blue Guitar", had reportedly been written when she was twelve. Despite developing a passion for music in her pubescent years, she was said not to have been a happy teenager. When questioned in 2013 by Radka Červinková from Mladá fronta DNES, she disclosed that it was mainly due to a struggle over ongoing concerns with her self-confidence at that time. "Guess it's hard to believe, but there were times when I felt so alone, because I thought I'm not good enough for anyone, that everything I do is wrong and I'll never accomplish anything. Maybe it was puberty but between the twelfth and fifteenth year I was a constant gloom-and-doom, and [I] wouldn't know what to do with myself. Only one thing saved me – the idea that I'm a quite good singer." Until the time her career-making moment arose, she was educated at the Forel International School, which was founded by her own mother, a devotee of the Baháʼí Faith.

2010–2011: SuperStar and career beginnings
Taking an advice from record producers Martin Šrámek and Andrej Hruška, both of which would soon become her mentors, Buckingham decided to audition in 2010 for season 2 of Česko Slovenská SuperStar, a co-production of the UK series Pop Idol.
Notes
A  As the opening track of the episode, Buckingham also performed a rendition of Lady Gaga's "Bad Romance", sung with the female ensemble.
B  The finalists also performed the ensemble track, "Nevzdávám", in addition released on the soundtrack Česko Slovenská SuperStar: Výběr finálových hitů (2011), along with Buckingham's solo number "You Had Me".

2012–2013: Don't Look Back and "Run Run Run"

2014: Where I Belong era and judging in Czech-Slovak X Factor
She received a nomination at the Radio Disney Music Awards in the Best New Artist category; the awards were held on April 27, 2014. On March 3, she released her new single named "I'm Not Sorry" from the album Where I Belong and dedicated it to all women for International Women's Day. In spring she guest starred in the Slovak television series Panelák.

Bibliography
Picture books
2007: The Lost Princess with Carmel Buckingham (illustrated by Georgina Soar)

Discography

Soundtracks
2011: Česko Slovenská SuperStar: Výběr finálových hitů

Studio albums
2012: Don't Look Back
2013: Where I Belong
2015: So Far So Good
2017: BARE
2022: Life

See also

Celeste Buckingham filmography
List of awards and nominations received by Celeste Buckingham
List of notable people surnamed Buckingham
List of singer-songwriters
Slovak popular music

Footnotes

References
General

Specific

External links

 Celeste Buckingham (official website)
 
 Celeste Buckingham on Belmont University
 Celeste Buckingham on Discogs
 Celeste Buckingham on FundAnything

 Celeste Buckingham on Mladá fronta DNES
 
 Celeste Buckingham at iREPORT.cz
 Celeste Buckingham at SuperMusic.sk

 
1995 births
Living people
Slovak people of American descent
Slovak people of Russian descent
Slovak expatriates in Switzerland
Naturalized citizens of Slovakia
Slovak children's writers
Slovak composers
21st-century Slovak women singers
21st-century Slovak women writers
EMI Records artists
Universal Records artists
Slovak women children's writers
Musicians from Zürich
21st-century Slovak writers